Ptericoptus is a genus of beetles in the family Cerambycidae, containing the following species:

 Ptericoptus acuminatus (Fabricius, 1801)
 Ptericoptus avanyae Martins & Galileo, 2010
 Ptericoptus borealis Breuning, 1939
 Ptericoptus caudalis Bates, 1880
 Ptericoptus clavicornis (Fabricius, 1801)
 Ptericoptus columbianus Breuning, 1950
 Ptericoptus corumbaensis Galileo & Martins, 2003
 Ptericoptus dorsalis Audinet-Serville, 1835
 Ptericoptus fuscus Bates, 1885
 Ptericoptus griseolus Bates, 1880
 Ptericoptus intermedius Breuning, 1939
 Ptericoptus meridionalis Breuning, 1939
 Ptericoptus panamensis Bates, 1880
 Ptericoptus similis Breuning, 1939
 Ptericoptus sinuatus Breuning, 1939

References

 
Cerambycidae genera